Handball Club Lada is a Russian women's handball club from Tolyatti playing in the Russian Super League.

Founded in 1998, Lada became the leading team in the Super League winning five championships in a row between 2002 and 2006 and a sixth one in 2008. It also built itself a name in Europe winning the 2002 Cup Winners' Cup in its international debut and reaching the final of the 2007 Champions League and the next edition's semifinals.

The following three seasons were less successful, with Dynamo Volgograd retrieving the leading position. On the other hand, Lada won the 2012 EHF Cup, its second international title, while attaining the national championship's bronze in 2009, 2011 and 2012.

In reaction to the 2022 Russian invasion of Ukraine, the International Handball Federation banned Russian athletes, and the European Handball Federation suspended the  Russian clubs from competing in European handball competitions.

Titles
 Russian Super League
Gold: 2002, 2003, 2004, 2005, 2006, 2008
Silver: 2001, 2007, 2014, 2015, 2017, 2018, 2019
Bronze: 2009, 2011, 2012, 2016, 2021
 Russian Cup
Gold: 2006
Silver: 2007, 2009, 2015, 2019
Bronze: 2010, 2012, 2013, 2014
 Champions League
Finalist: 2007
 Cup Winners' Cup
Winner: 2002 
 EHF Cup
Winner: 2012, 2014

European record

Kits

Team

Current squad 
Squad for the 2021–22 season

Goalkeepers
 16  Valiantsina Voitulevich
 31  Daria Dereven
Wingers
RW
 2  Olga Fomina
 77  Anastasiya Novoselova
LW
 22  Natalia Reshetnikova
 28  Alena Nosikova
 47  Valentina Barynina
Line players
 4  Yana Zhilinskayte
 7  Julia Kakmolja
 75  Alena Amelchenko

Back players 
LB
 78  Irina Nikitina
 23  Anna Golubeva
CB
 14  Veronika Nikitina
 25  Olga Sherbak
 35  Valeriia Kirdiasheva
 36  Anastasia Portyagina
 88  Arishina Liubov
RB
 29  Valeriya Ganicheva

Transfers
Transfers for the 2022–23 season

 Joining
  Karina Sisenova (RB) (from  HC Astrakhanochka)

 Leaving

Staff members
Staff for the 2021-22 season.
 President: Irina Bliznova
 Head coach: Alexey Alekseev
 Assistant coach: Yekaterina Marennikova
 Assistant/Goalkeeping coach: Tatiana Erokhina

Notable former players

 Yekaterina Marennikova (2004-2010, 2011-2012)
 Nadezhda Muravyeva (2002-2010, 2011-2015)
 Natalya Shipilova (2001-2006, 2010-2013)
 Irina Bliznova (2004-2012, 2014, 2016, 2019-)
 Olga Chernoivanenko (2008-2014, 2018-)
 Ekaterina Davydenko (2006-2014, 2018-)
 Daria Dmitrieva (2015-2019)
 Tatiana Erokhina (2002-2013, 2014-2016)
 Oksana Korolyova (2001-2002, 2002-2007)
 Yekaterina Atkova (2008-2009)
 Mariya Basarab (2008-2014)
 Yelena Dmitriyeva (2001-2004)
 Tatyana Dronina (2010-2011)
 Olga Gorshenina (2009-2014)
 Elena Utkina (2015-2019)
 Anna Kareyeva (2001-2004)
 Yekaterina Ilyina (2013-2013)
 Olga Akopyan (2015-2016)
 Elizaveta Malashenko (2013-2017)
 Irina Nikitina (2006-2013)
 Irina Poltoratskaya (2001-2004)
 Lyudmila Postnova (2003-2010)
 Daria Samokhina (2007-2017)
 Mariya Sidorova (2001-2012)
 Irina Snopova (2016-2018)
 Inna Suslina (2001-2014)
 Polina Vyakhireva (2004-2007)
 Victoria Zhilinskayte (2008-2014)
 Yana Zhilinskayte (2008-2014)
 June Andenæs (2013)
 Natalia Parhomenko (2013-2014)
 Yuliya Andriychuk (2013-2014)

Kit manufacturers
 Kempa

References

Lada
Lada handball